Jamie Delgado and Ken Skupski were the defending champions but did not participate.
Karol Beck and Andrej Martin won the final 6–3, 3–6, [10–8] against Claudio Grassi and Amir Weintraub.

Seeds

Draw

Draw

References
 Main Draw

Trofeo Faip-Perrel - Doubles
2013 Doubles